XHHES-FM is a radio station in Chihuahua, Chihuahua. Broadcasting on 94.1 FM, XHHES is owned by Radiorama and operated by Grupo Bustillos Radio as "La Patrona".

History
XHHES began operations in 1987 as XEHES-AM 1040. It received approval to migrate to FM in 2011.

In 2016, XHHES and XHUA-FM 90.1 switched formats and operation, with XHHES inheriting the longtime "Estéreo Vida" contemporary format.

In 2020, Grupo Bustillos Radio took over operation of XHHES-FM and flipped the station to its "La Patrona" format of Regional Mexican music.

References

External links
La Patrona de Chihuahua Facebook

Radio stations in Chihuahua
Mass media in Chihuahua City